Mount Katahdin is the highest mountain in the U.S. state of Maine at . Named Katahdin, which means "Great Mountain", by the Penobscot Native Americans, it is within Northeast Piscataquis, Piscataquis County, and is the centerpiece of Baxter State Park. It is a steep, tall massif formed from a granite intrusion weathered to the surface. The flora and fauna on the mountain are typical of those found in northern New England.

Katahdin was known to the Native Americans in the region and was known to Europeans at least since 1689. It has inspired hikes, climbs, journal narratives, paintings, and a piano sonata. The area around the peak was protected by Governor Percival Baxter starting in the 1930s. Katahdin is the northern terminus of the Appalachian Trail and is near a stretch known as the Hundred-Mile Wilderness.

In 1967, Mount Katahdin was designated as a National Natural Landmark by the National Park Service.

The mountain is commonly called just "Katahdin", though the official name is "Mount Katahdin" as decided by the US Board on Geographic Names in 1893.

Geography

It is on the drainage divide between the East and West branches of the Penobscot River.

The mountain massif itself consists of multiple peaks. Baxter Peak is the tallest, and is the official northern terminus of the Appalachian Trail. South Peak and Pamola Peak are southeast and east of Baxter Peak, respectively, along the Knife Edge ridgeline, while Hamlin Peak lies to the north.

There is low lake country to the south and west of Katahdin, and lowlands extending east to the Atlantic and north to the Saint Lawrence River in Canada.

It is commonly thought that Katahdin is the first place in the United States mainland to receive sunlight in the morning, but this is incorrect. Other mountains lower in elevation but farther to the east or southeast see the first sunrise of the day, depending on the season.

Geology
Katahdin is part of a laccolith that formed in the Acadian orogeny when an island arc collided with eastern North America approximately 400 million years ago. On the sides of Katahdin are four glacial cirques carved into the granite by alpine glaciers and in these cirques behind moraines and eskers are several ponds.

In Baxter State Park, many outcrops of sedimentary rocks have striations, whereas Katahdin Granite and Traveler Rhyolite lava have weathered surfaces on which striations are commonly not preserved. Bedrock surfaces of igneous rocks which were buried by glacial sediments and only recently exposed have well preserved striations, as in the vicinity of Ripogenus Dam. Several outcrops of sedimentary rocks along the Patten Road show striations, especially on the north side of the road at Hurricane Deck. A few outcrops near the Pattern Road just north of Horse Mountain are striated, as are several outcrops of sedimentary rocks along the road from Trout Brook Farm northward to Second Lake Matagamon.

Fauna
Fauna include black bear, deer, and moose as well as black flies and mosquitos in the spring. A subspecies of Arctic butterfly, known as the Katahdin Arctic (Oeneis polixenes katahdin) is specific to the area, and is currently listed as endangered.
Among the birds are Bicknell's thrush and various songbirds and raptors. A study of the animal communities was published by Irving H. Blake in 1926. The flora includes pine, spruce, fir, hemlock, beech, maple, birch, aspen, and pincushion plant (Diapensia lapponica).

Human history

Katahdin is referred to 60 years after Field's climb of Agiokochuk (Mount Washington) in the writings of John Gyles, a teenage colonist who was captured near Portland, Maine, in 1689 by the Abenaki. While in the company of Abenaki hunting parties, he traveled up and down several Maine rivers including both branches of the Penobscot, passing close to "Teddon".  He remarked that it was higher than the White Hills above the Saco River.

Among some Native Americans, Katahdin was believed to be the home of the storm god Pamola, and thus an area to be avoided.

The first recorded climb of "Catahrdin" was by Massachusetts surveyors Zackery Adley and Charles Turner, Jr. in August 1804.  In the 1840s Henry David Thoreau climbed Katahdin, which he spelled "Ktaadn"; his ascent is recorded in a well-known chapter of The Maine Woods.  A few years later Theodore Winthrop wrote about his visit in Life in the Open Air.  Painters Frederic Edwin Church and Marsden Hartley are well-known artists who created landscapes of Katahdin. On 30 November 2011, Christie's auctioned Church's 1860 painting Twilight (Katahdin) for $3.1 million. The letter describing the ascent of Charles Turner Jr. states that they began at the (West Branch Penobscot) at 8:00 a.m. and arrived on the summit at 5:00 p.m. guided by two Native Americans who were initially cautious but when the "cold part of the mountain" was reached and sensing the determination of the others became ambitious to reach the top first.  Turner lists his party as: William Howe, Amos Patten, Joseph Treat, Samuel  Call, William Rice, Richard Winslow, Charles Turner, Jr. In the 1930s Governor Percival Baxter began to acquire land and finally deeded more than 200,000 acres (809 km2) to the State of Maine for a park, named Baxter State Park after him. The summit was officially recognized by the US Board on Geographic Names as "Baxter Peak" in 1931.

Recreation opportunities
As the northern terminus of the Appalachian Trail and southern terminus of the International Appalachian Trail, Katahdin is a popular hiking and backpacking destination and the centerpiece of Baxter State Park. Baxter State Park is open year-round, though strictly regulated in winter.  The overnight camping season is, weather permitting, from May 15 to October 15 each year, with some campgrounds staying open until October 22.  Capacity limits have been placed on day use parking at the trailheads to minimize the overuse of trails.

Mt. Katahdin has several trails leading up to Baxter, Pamola, or Hamlin Peaks These trails start right up the mountain, but each trail on the mountain ends up taking eight to ten hours round-trip depending on ability. The rest of the trails go up the north side or west side of the mountain. These are accessed from the Chimney Pond Trail. For these trails, hikers must park at the Roaring Brook Campground and hike in. All trails are maintained by the Baxter State Park Authority, which runs the State Park. All of the trails on the mountain are classified as very strenuous, the highest classification the Park Authority gives, except for Saddle (strenuous), Hamlin Ridge trail (moderate), and Chimney Pond (moderate).

The most famous hike to the summit goes along Knife Edge, a glacial Arête which traverses the ridge between Pamola Peak and Baxter Peak. The mountain has claimed 23 lives between 1963 and 2012, mostly from exposure in bad weather and falls from the Knife Edge. There have been more than 60 deaths on Katahdin since 1933 including October 8 and 9, 2020. For about 3/10 of a mile the trail is 3 feet wide, with a drop off on either side. The Knife Edge is closed during periods of high wind.

Namesakes 
 Two US Navy ships have been named USS Katahdin. Katahdin is also the name of a 1914 steamboat (later converted to diesel) owned by the Moosehead Marine Museum that plies the waters of Moosehead Lake in northern Maine.
 The Katahdin potato, which was certified by the U.S. Department of Agriculture in 1932, and is still popular in the Northeastern United States.
 The Katahdin sheep.
 Composer Alan Hovhaness composed a sonata for piano in 1987 titled Mt. Katahdin, dedicated to Carleton S. Coon for his 60th birthday.
 Katahdin is a monster in 1979 horror film Prophecy.

See also

Donn Fendler – author of book about being lost on Katahdin in 1939.
Katahdin Woods and Waters National Monument
List of mountain peaks of North America
List of mountain peaks of the United States
List of U.S. states by elevation
List of mountains of Maine

References

External links

 More detailed Wiki on Katahdin Including Trails
 Katahdin Webcam
 Katahdin Webcam - Millinocket
 Katahdin Webcam - Twin Pine Camps, Millinocket
  (photos)
 Baxter State Park Authority Official Website
 Summit Log (October 2005 summit log)
 Katahdin at Summitpost many photos

Mountains of Maine
Mountains of Piscataquis County, Maine
Mountains on the Appalachian Trail
Highest points of U.S. states
National Natural Landmarks in Maine
New England Four-thousand footers
North American 1000 m summits
North Maine Woods
Protected areas of Piscataquis County, Maine
Religious places of the indigenous peoples of North America
Sacred mountains
Devonian magmatism